Mangelia rhabdea is a species of sea snail, a marine gastropod mollusk in the family Mangeliidae.

Description
The length of the shell attains 4.5 mm, its diameter 1.5 mm.

(Original description) The white shell has a smooth protoconch of about one whorl and three subsequent nearly cylindrical whorls. The suture is distinct, not appressed. The anal fasciole is faintly indicated;. The axial sculpture consists only of obscure incremental lines. The spiral sculpture consists on the body whorl only, of a faint suggestion of an angle at the shoulder. The aperture is narrow, about two-fifths as long as the shell. The outer lip is thin, protractively arcuate. The anal sulcus is wide and deep. The columella is straight. The siphonal canal is hardly differentiated.

Distribution
This marine species was found off Fernandina, Florida, USA.

References

External links
 Smithsonian Institution: Mangilia rhabdea
  Tucker, J.K. 2004 Catalog of recent and fossil turrids (Mollusca: Gastropoda). Zootaxa 682:1–1295.

rhabdea
Gastropods described in 1927